Maggie T may refer to:
 Margaret Thatcher (1925–2013), British stateswoman and former Prime Minister, informally referred to as Maggie T
 Maggie Tabberer (born 1936), Australian television personality, launched a plus-size clothing label called Maggie T

See also
 "I'm in Love with Margaret Thatcher", in which Thatcher is humorously referred to as Maggie T
 Maggie (disambiguation)